John W. McDevitt  (December 28, 1906 – December 6, 1994) was the eleventh Supreme Knight of the Knights of Columbus from 1964 to 1977.

Early life and education 
Born in Malden, Massachusetts on December 27, 1906, McDevitt was the son of John F. McDevitt and Margaret Agnes ( Sullivan). He attended Imaculate Conception School and then Boston College High School. He earned both a bachelor's and a master's degree from Boston College in 1928 and 1929, respectively.

Career

Educator 
McDevitt taught history at Lincoln Junior High School in Malden, and then was then made principal on December 17, 1935. Shortly thereafter, elections were held and a new School Committee was elected.  The new Committee rescinded his appointment on January 26, 1936.  McDevitt sued, and the case was dismissed by the Supreme Judicial Court in 1937.

On August 22, 1942 he was made superintendent of Waltham Public Schools.  He served in this position until December 7, 1961 when he resigned to focus on his work as Deputy Supreme Knight of the Knights of Columbus. The School Street Middle School was named after him in Waltham. He was nominated to the state Board of Education in 1951 and served for nine years. He served on that board with fellow State Deputy Frank W. Tomasello.

Knights of Columbus 
In 1932, McDevitt joined the Santa Maria Council of the Knights of Columbus in Malden. He held several positions, including serving as grand knight twice. He then rose through the chairs of the state council and was made State Deputy of Massachusetts on May 11, 1948. 

McDevitt was largely responsible for getting a law passed by the Great and General Court of Massachusetts allowing fraternal societies such as the Knights of Columbus to sell insurance in the Commonwealth. It was signed by Governor Paul A. Dever, a past grand knight from the Mt. Pleasant Council in West Roxbury. McDevitt also played a role in the defeat of the legalization of birth control in the 1948 referendum.

He was made Master of the Fourth Degree in Massachusetts in 1952 and a Supreme Director in 1955.  On October 21, 1960, he was elected Deputy Supreme Knight and on February 22, 1964, he became the 11th Supreme Knight.  As Supreme Knight, he ended discrimination against black people in 1964 and asked the Supreme Council to consider admitting women in 1969.

By 1970, some states had legalized abortion. McDevitt responded to this trend at the 1970 convention, defining the Knights as an anti-abortion organization. He said, "We, the knights of today, likewise must serve in the role of protectors...we must be the knights who hold up the banner of life. We must be for life." In 1973, after the Roe v. Wade ruling, the Supreme Convention passed a resolution supporting an anti-abortion constitutional amendment. McDevitt denounced Roe v. Wade as "shocking and unfortunate", and urged councils to take local action to "offset the harmful effects of this lamentable decision." In 1975, the Knights donated $50,000 to the US bishops in support of anti-abortion efforts.

Honors 
In 1971, McDevitt was honored by Pope Paul VI with the Order of Pius IX, the highest papal honor which can be conferred on a Catholic layman who is not a head of state.  Pope Paul also placed McDevitt on the advisory board for Vatican City and gave him several other honors. He also won the 1966 Brotherhood Award from B'Nai B'rith.

McDevitt held honorary degrees from Saint Michael's College, The Catholic University of America, and Boston College.

Personal life 
With his wife Mary Cecilia Kelley McDevitt, he had two sons, John Kelley McDevitt and William Paul McDevitt.  John Kelley became assistant Supreme Advocate in 1975.

In 1998, after his death, the delegates at the Supreme Council meeting established a scholarship fund in his name.

References

Works cited

Knights of the Order of Pope Pius IX
1906 births
1994 deaths
People from Waltham, Massachusetts
Supreme Knights of the Knights of Columbus
Deputy Supreme Knights of the Knights of Columbus
Catholics from Massachusetts